Alisa Childers is the self-titled debut album by former ZOEgirl member Alisa Childers. The album was released on December 1, 2007, and is also available online for download. It is the only solo album released by Alisa.

Track listing 
All songs written by Alisa Childers except where noted.
"The Truth Is..." - 4:09
"Take It From Me" - 4:20
"Skeletons" - 4:19
"I Say" - 3:48
"Bar On 59th" - 4:24
"Pretty Prison" - 3:24
"Bridges" - 3:32
"Glory" - 3:50
"Wake Me Up" - 2:50
"Baptize Me" - 6:12
"The Times They Are A-Changin'" (Bob Dylan) - 3:31

Personnel 
 Alisa Childers – vocals, acoustic piano (1, 3-11), backing vocals (2-10), Rhodes piano (2, 9, 10), acoustic guitar (2, 4, 6, 7, 9, 10), keyboards (5, 6, 11)
 Greg Hagan – electric guitar (1, 4, 5), guitars (6)
 Shane Hill – acoustic guitar (1)
 David Cleveland – electric guitar (2, 3, 4, 7), guitars (9)
 Jackie Street – bass (1, 7)
 Mark Childers – bass (2-6, 9, 11)
 Mike Childers – drums (1-7, 9, 10, 11)
 Matt Butler – cello (3, 8, 10)
 Chuck Girard – backing vocals (10)

References

2007 albums
Pop albums by American artists